Ivan Arkadin was a Soviet actor. Honored Artist of the RSFSR.

Biography 
In 1908 Ivan began to play in the drama theater of P.P. Gaideburov. In 1914-1938 he worked at the Moscow Chamber Theater, and after that at the State Central Youth Theater.

Selected filmography 
 1930 — St. Jorgen's Day
 1936 — The Last Night
 1938 — Doctor Aybolit

References

External links 
 Иван Аркадин on kino-teatr.ru

Soviet male actors
Male actors from the Russian Empire
1878 births
1942 deaths